1980 in professional wrestling describes the year's events in the world of professional wrestling.

List of notable promotions 
These promotions held notable shows in 1980.

Calendar of notable shows

Notable Events
April 21 - At New York's Madison Square Garden, Ken Patera pinned Pat Patterson to become the new WWF Intercontinental champion.
December 8 - At New York's Madison Square Garden, Pedro Morales pinned Ken Patera to become the new WWF Intercontinental champion.

Accomplishments and tournaments

AJPW

NJPW

Awards and honors

Pro Wrestling Illustrated

Wrestling Observer Newsletter

Births

January 8 – Ricky Marvin
January 12 - Ares
January 20 – Karl Anderson
January 25 – Michelle McCool
February 2 - Teddy Hart 
February 5 - Kazuhiro Tamura 
February 6 – Konnor
February 9 – Shelly Martinez
February 13 - Carlos Cotto 
February 15 - LuFisto 
February 18 - Hideki Suzuki 
February 24 – Shinsuke Nakamura
March 9 - Genba Hirayanagi
March 19 - Taichi Ishikari
March 28 - Nick Mondo 
April 1 – Randy Orton
April 2 - Jody Fleisch
April 7 – David Otunga
April 10 - Jesse Neal
April 12 - Masayuki Kono
April 16:
Muhammad Hassan 
Paul London
April 17 - Hartley Jackson 
April 30 - Rob Terry 
May 2 - Caylen Croft 
May 6 - Colt Cabana 
May 11 - Nick Berk 
June 1 - Ángel Azteca Jr.
June 3: 
Pepper Parks
Ryoji Sai 
June 8:
Scott Lost
Super Dragon
June 27 - Big Dick Johnson 
July 8 : 
Brian Danovich (died in 2018) 
Hikaru Sato 
July 11 – Tyson Kidd
July 15 - BxB Hulk 
July 16 - Excalibur 
July 17 - Masato Yoshino 
July 27 – Dolph Ziggler
August 8 – Shayna Baszler
August 10 – Wade Barrett
August 11 - Patrick Schulz 
August 17 - Rohit Raju 
August 19 - Chet Jablonski 
August 28 - Demus 3:16 
August 30 - Alicia Taylor 
September 6 – Jillian Hall
September 10 – Trevor Murdoch
September 14 - Dom Travis (died in 2012) 
September 22 - Nick Gage 
September 23 - Romeo Roselli 
October 4: 
Naruki Doi 
Sebastian Hackl 
October 8 – The Miz
October 28 – Christy Hemme
 November 10 – Katarina Waters
November 12 – Trent Acid (died in 2010) 
November 13:
Sara Del Rey
Tomomitsu Matsunaga 
November 17 – Mercedes Martinez
November 17 - Jay Bradley
November 24 – Beth Phoenix
November 25 - Josh Mathews 
December 2 - Mario Bokara 
December 4 – Viktor
December 9 - Escoria 
December 12 - Shockercito 
December 19 - Delirious 
December 26 – Faby Apache
December 27 – Cesaro
December 31 - Matt Cross

Deaths
February 27 - Kola Kwariani, 77
March unknown date - Otto Kuss, 68
April 5 - Ruffy Silverstein (American wrestler), 66
June 11 - Wolfgang Ehrl, 68
September 17 - Big Bad John, 37

Debuts
 Uncertain debut date 
 The Barbarian (wrestler)
 Brad Armstrong (wrestler)
 Wildman Firpo
 Brad Rheingans
 Gary Royal 
 Mike Shaw

Retirements
 Eddie Graham (1947 - 1980)
 Haystacks Calhoun (1956-1980)

References

 
professional wrestling